(Francis) Norman Thicknesse (b Deane, Lancashire 9 Aug. 1858 - d St Albans 13 April 1946) was Archdeacon of Middlesex, from 1930  until 1933.

Of a Lancashire landed gentry family, the son of a bishop he was educated at Winchester and BNC. He held incumbencies in Limehouse, Northampton and Hornsey. He was Rector of St George's, Hanover Square from 1911 to 1933; and Rural Dean of Westminster from 1912 to 1927.

His son was Cuthbert Thicknesse, Dean of St Albans from 1936 to 1955.

Notes

1858 births
People educated at Winchester College
Alumni of Brasenose College, Oxford
Archdeacons of Middlesex
1946 deaths
People from Deane